Zoran Đorđević (born 1959) is a Serbian photographer.

Career and work
Đorđević was born in Kragujevac, Serbia. He graduated top of the class from the Press Photography Department of the Yugoslav Institute for Journalism in Belgrade. Đorđević started his photography career in the mid-eighties contributing to magazines Omladinske novine, Mladina (Slovenia), Feral, Oko, Polet (Croatia) and Pogledi, where he soon became photo editor.

In 1986, he accepted an offer by the biggest automotive industry of former Yugoslavia and joined its advertising team, working on advertising campaigns for western markets. He cooperated with the design and marketing departments of BMW and Fiat, with designers in the USA, and with many advertising agencies from the region of former Yugoslavia. Together with Wolf Eggers of BMW, Đorđević created an advertising campaign for the new model of cars that were being designed for the German market. He was also author and co-author the Guide to Yugo, which was designed for the American market, and whose graphical solutions were later taken over by the Mazda advertising team, which published a similar publication about its own company.

In 1996, working as press photographer for the weekly magazine Svetlost, Đorđević returned to the photographic genre which brought him the greatest success. He won significant awards for photography, among them the Diploma of Anastas Jovanovic and the Award for the Best Photography of Yugoslavia and Serbia. The Serbian Academy of Sciences and Arts included his work in its reference book of photographs that had a historical impact on the development of photography in Serbia. The artistic jury of the Photo Association of Serbia awarded Đorđević with the greatest photography title — Master of Photography, while the leading International Federation of Photographic Art, FIAP, granted him the title of AFIAP (Artist of FIAP). Đorđević has won over 60 international and national awards in total.

The Slovo publishing house published his book of photographs entitled The Guardian of Your Dreams.

Apart from being a photographer, Đorđević is also a lawyer by profession. He is a member of FIPRESCI, the International Federation of Film Critics and a film lecturer at the Students' Cultural Centre of Kragujevac. He helped establish BELDOCS, the International Festival of Documentary Film in Belgrade. He works at TV Kragujevac as documentary and film editor.

Publications
Guardian of Your Dreams. Kraljevo: Slovo, 1992. . With a foreword by Sava Stepanov. Edition of 500 copies.
Monography. 2012. With a Foreword by Dejan Đorić. Edition of 500 copies.
Classic. Helicon Publishing, 2016. With a Foreword by Dejan Đorić and Sava Stepanov. Edition of 300 copies.

Sources 
 Biography on Kragujevac website in Serbian
 http://users.beotel.net/~fotogram/stranice/bratislava.htm
 http://semendria.com/?event=izlozbe-fotografija-zorana-dordevica
 https://web.archive.org/web/20120425092430/http://www.fotoss.org/desavanja2010.html
 http://www.arte.rs/sr/galerije/kulturni_centar_beograda-15/izlozbe/nove_slike_beograda_2000_2010-621/?page=2

References

External links 
 

1959 births
Living people
Serbian photographers
People from Kragujevac
AFIAP